Duchess of Fife is the typically the wife of the Duke of Fife, an extant title in the Peerage of the United Kingdom which has been created twice, in both cases for Alexander Duff, 6th Earl Fife. In one case however, the incumbent was Duchess of Fife in her own right (suo jure).

 Louise, Princess Royal (1867–1931), eldest daughter of King Edward VII, wife of the 1st Duke
 Princess Alexandra, 2nd Duchess of Fife (1891–1959), elder daughter of the 1st Duke. 2nd Duchess Suo jure
 Caroline Worsley, Lady Worsley (born 1934), wife of the 3rd Duke 
 Caroline Bunting (born 1961), wife of the 4th Duke

See also 

PS Duchess of Fife British paddle steamers